Alexander Kaltner (born 24 October 1999) is a German footballer who plays as a forward for Kreisliga club MTV München.

Career
Kaltner made his professional debut for SpVgg Unterhaching in the 3. Liga on 23 February 2019, coming on as a substitute in the 86th minute for Maximilian Bauer in the 0–1 away loss against Eintracht Braunschweig. In January 2020, Kaltner joined Regionalliga Bayern side TSV 1860 Rosenheim on loan until the end of the season.

Kaltner moved to Kreisliga club MTV München in 222.

References

External links
 Profile at kicker.de
 Profile at DFB.de
 

1999 births
Living people
German footballers
Association football forwards
SpVgg Unterhaching players
TSV 1860 Rosenheim players
3. Liga players
Regionalliga players
Footballers from Munich
21st-century German people